Suicide Commandos is a 1968 Italian war movie starring Aldo Ray. It was directed by Camillo Bazzoni and based on the 1966 novel Commando 44 by Piet Lay.

Cast
Aldo Ray as Sergeant Cloadec
Tano Cimarosa as Calleya 
Ugo Fangareggi as Harper (as Hugh Fangar-Smith)
Luis Dávila as Sam 
Manuel Zarzo  as Sorrel
Pamela Tudor as Calleya's Wife
Vira Silenti as Frau Vonberg

External links

Suicide Commandos at Grindhouse Database

1968 films
1968 war films
Macaroni Combat films
Italian war films
Italian World War II films
1960s Italian films